Outlaw Volleyball is a video game based on the sport of volleyball. It was originally published for the Xbox and included a sampler CD of tunes by cover band Diffuser.  It was later ported to the PlayStation 2 with two new courts and a handful of additional player costumes, accessories, etc. under the title Outlaw Volleyball Remixed. The game features Steve Carell as the announcer.

Gameplay 
The game follows the normal rules of volleyball and a standard game with standard rules can be played. However, there are a number of different modes that mix up the standard formula. One example is Hot Potato, where the ball is played as a timer ticks down, and once it runs out the ball explodes upon impact of the nearest player. Another is "Casino Round", where the longer the rally, the more money the scoring team on that play gets. Individual settings can also be altered within these modes, such as adjusting whether only the serving team can score a point ("side out" rule) or any team who wins the rally gets a point.

Fighting with other characters in an option before a serve where a player can choose to fight an opponent on the other side of the net. If the player wins they earn the victim's momentum bar. Beating tokens are earned after great plays and a turnover of the serve.

Outlaw Volleyball Red Hot! 
Released as a rental-only exclusive for Blockbuster, and meant to serve as a side game to the original rather than a full-fledged sequel. The game is set in Hell and contains only one court, the "Pit of Hell", which was not in the original Outlaw Volleyball. Returning characters also had slight outfit variants to reflect the setting, like red horns and devil wings. The game can now be found at many used game retailers.

Reception

Reviews ranged from positive to very mixed.  GameRankings and Metacritic gave Outlaw Volleyball a score of 79% and 77 out of 100, and also gave Outlaw Volleyball Remixed a score of 64% and 57 out of 100.

See also
 Beach Spikers
 Dead or Alive Xtreme Beach Volleyball
 Summer Heat Beach Volleyball

References

External links

2003 video games
Beach volleyball video games
PlayStation 2 games
Video games developed in the United States
Video games featuring female protagonists
Video games set in New York City
Xbox games
RenderWare games
Global Star Software games
TDK Mediactive games
Simon & Schuster Interactive games